Thomas Graves (c. 1580–1635) was one of the original Adventurers (stockholders) of the Virginia Company of London, and one of the very early Planters (settlers) who founded Jamestown, Virginia, the first permanent English settlement in North America. He was also the first known person named Graves in North America. Captain Thomas Graves is listed as one of the original Adventurers as "Thomas Grave" on page 364, Records of the Virginia Company of London, vol. IV.

Graves arrived in Virginia in October 1608 on the ship Mary and Margaret with Captain Christopher Newport's second supply.

Captain Thomas Graves settled at Smythe's Hundred, situated on the north shore of the James River ten miles from Jamestown.  Governor George Yeardley placed Graves in charge of Smythe's Hundred on May 30, 1618, after one man killed another in a fight.

Capt. Thomas Graves was a member of the First Legislative Assembly in America, and, with Mr. Walter Shelley, sat for Smythe's Hundred when they met at Jamestown, Virginia on July 30, 1619. His name appears on a monument to the first House of Burgesses which stands at Jamestown today.

Smythe's Hundred was abandoned after the Indian uprising of 1622.  The next record of Captain Graves showed him living on the Eastern Shore of Virginia by February 16, 1624.

On February 8, 1627, Captain Francis West, Governor of Virginia, ordered that Thomas Graves have a commission to command the Plantation at Accomac. Graves was the second Commander. He lived on Old Plantation Creek, now in Northampton County, Virginia, and served as Commissioner for Accomac Shire in 1629. 

Captain Graves and three others represented the Eastern Shore in the Assembly of 1629‑30. He served again as a burgess in 1632. Because he was designated as "Esquire" on January 6, 1635, he may have been a member of the Council.

Captain Thomas Graves, Esquire, was recorded as being a Justice at a court held for Accomac on April 13, 1635. 

He died between November 1635, when he witnessed a deed, and January 5, 1635/6, when suit was entered for Mrs. Graves concerning theft by a servant.  He was survived by his wife, Katherine, and six children:  John, Thomas, Ann, Verlinda, Katherine and Francis.

His daughter, Verlinda, eventually married governor of Maryland, William Stone.

References

External links
Descendants of Captain Thomas Graves
Graves Family Association
Thomas Graves at the Jamestowne Society
AMERICA'S OLDEST LEGISLATIVE ASSEMBLY and Its Jamestown Statehouse Edited by Charles E. Hatch. Jr. Revised 1956
Graves Family Association

Virginia politicians
1580s births
1635 deaths

17th-century American people
English emigrants